The following is a list of noted French singers.

A

Abyale
Adé (singer) 
Salvatore Adamo (often known as Adamo)
Isabelle Adjani
Aketo (band: Sniper)
Akhenaton (band: IAM)
Frank Alamo
Alizée
Alma
Amanda Lear
Amine
Anaïs
Angèle
Eve Angeli
Isabelle Antena
Antoine
Arletty
Carol Arnauld
Assia (born in Algeria, with a singing career in France)
Jean-Louis Aubert (band: Téléphone)
Isabelle Aubret
François Audrain
Hugues Aufray
Les Avions
Jennifer Ayache (band: Superbus)
Charles Aznavour (May 22, 1924 - October 1, 2018)
Nabil Andrieu (band: PNL)
Tarik Andrieu (band: PNL)

B

Pierre Bachelet
Chimène Badi
Josephine Baker (June 3, 1906 - April 12, 1975, born in the United States, later became a French citizen)
Daniel Balavoine
Jeanne Balibar
Barbara
Didier Barbelivien
Brigitte Bardot
Phil Barney
Alain Barrière
Jenifer Bartoli (better known as Jenifer)
Claude Barzotti
Alain Bashung
Axel Bauer
Marguerite Baux (fl. from 1876), opera singer
Camille Bazbaz
Guy Béart
Gilbert Bécaud
Bénabar
Amel Bent
Michel Berger
Jac Berrocal
Louis Bertignac
Priscilla Betti (for children)
Bibie (born in Ghana, with a singing career in France)
Bill Baxter
Benjamin Biolay
Ronnie Bird
Jane Birkin (born in England, with a singing career in France)
Black M
Blacko (band: Sniper)
Gérard Blanc
Bernie Bonvoisin
Booba
Boris
Bourvil
Jacqueline Boyer
Lucienne Boyer
Mike Brant (born in Israel, with a singing career in France)
Georges Brassens
Christian Braut
Jacques Brel (born in Belgium, with a singing career in France)
Françoiz Breut
Dany Brillant
Zina Brozia (1876–1958), opera singer
Patrick Bruel
Carla Bruni (born in Italy)
Jean-Jacques Burnel
Buzy

C

Francis Cabrel
Cali
Calogero
Camille
Amélie-Julie Candeille
Bertrand Cantat (band: Noir Désir)
Jil Caplan
Carlos (for children)
Jean-Roger Caussimon
Cerrone
Alain Chamfort
Manu Chao
Marie Charbonnel (1880–1969), contralto opera singer
Corynne Charby
Éric Charden (born in Vietnam, with a singing career in France) 
Lyse Charny (1890–1950), contralto
Jeremy Chatelain
Louis Chedid
Georges Chelon
Karen Cheryl
Maurice Chevalier
Christophe
Petula Clark
Philippe Clay
Coralie Clément
Julien Clerc
Richard Cocciante (born in Vietnam, with a singing career in France)
Colonel Reyel
Annie Cordy (born in Belgium, with a singing career in France)
Karine Costa
Charlélie Couture
Nicole Croisille
Pauline Croze

D

Muriel Dacq (born in Belgium, with a singing career in France)
Étienne Daho
Dalida (born in Egypt of Italian ancestry, with a singing career in France and worldwide)
Damia
Pascal Danel
Dani
Daphné
Daniel Darc
Danielle Darrieux
Joe Dassin (born in the United States, with a singing career in France)
Dave (born in the Netherlands, with a singing career in France)
FR David
David et Jonathan
Gerald De Palmas
Rose Delaunay, operatic soprano
Vincent Delerm
Michel Delpech
Lucienne Delyle
Graziella de Michele
Willy Denzey
Bill Deraime
Henri Dès (for children)
Lizzy Mercier Descloux
Linda de Suza (born Teolinda Joaquina de Souza Lança in Portugal, with a singing career in both France and Portugal)
Desireless
Deva Dassy
Sacha Distel
Julien Doré
Françoise Dorléac
Dorothée (for children)
Gill Dougherty
Marie Dubas
Anne Ducros
Odette Dulac
Daniele Dupre
Jean Dujardin (comic performer and singer)
Yves Duteil
Jacques Dutronc
Thomas Dutronc

E

Louis Edwards
Émilie Satt, lead vocalist of Madame Monsieur
Emmanuelle
Pauline Ester
Erza Muqoli
Edith Piaf

F

Lara Fabian (born in Belgium, with a singing career in France)
Fanny
Mylène Farmer
France Gall (October 9, 1947 - January 7, 2018)
François Feldman
Louise Féron
Jean Ferrat
Léo Ferré (born in Monaco, with a singing career in France)
Catherine Ferry
Patrick Fiori
Liane Foly
Brigitte Fontaine
Tom Frager (born in Senegal, with a singing career in France)
Claude François
Françoise Hardy
Frédéric François (born Francesco Barracta; also known as François Barra in Sicily, Italy; residing in French-speaking Wallonia, Belgium)
Jean-Pierre François
Michel Fugain

G

Jean Gabin
Charlotte Gainsbourg
Serge Gainsbourg
France Gall
Garou (born in Canada, with a singing career in France)
Julie Gayet
Danyel Gérard
Jean-Jacques Goldman
Goûts de Luxe
Chantal Goya (for children)
Juliette Gréco
Grégoire
Jean Guidoni
David Guetta

H

Arthur H
Amir Haddad (better known as Amir)
Johnny Hallyday
Françoise Hardy
Mireille Hartuch
Thierry Hazard
Patrick Hernandez
Jacques Higelin

I

Sebastien Izambard
Indila
Isleym
 Izzy Dallas (American singer-songwriter, born Isidore LeDeaux in Paris, France.)

J

Jain
Jacno
Gerard Jaffrès
Véronique Jannot
Agnès Jaoui
Jean-Baptiste Maunier
Zizi Jeanmaire
Jenifer
C. Jérôme
JoeyStarr (band: NTM)
Michel Jonasz
Jessy Matador
Jordy (for children)
Josephine Baker (June 3, 1906 - April 12, 1975)
Joyce Jonathan
Juliette

K

Patricia Kaas
Kamini
Katerine
Marina Kaye
Keen'V
Kendji Girac
Yianna Katsoulos (born in the United States, with a singing career in France)
Keren Ann (born in Israel, with a singing career in France)
Koxie

L

Lââm
Jean-Pascal Lacoste
Jean-Jacques Lafon
Marie Laforêt
Francis Lalanne
Ketty Lapeyrette (1884–1960), opera singer
Serge Lama
Amanda Lear
Boby Lapointe
Catherine Lara
Laroche-Valmont
Rose Laurens
Philippe Lavil
Bernard Lavilliers
Marc Lavoine
Maxime Le Forestier
Jeanne Leclerc (1868–1914), soprano
Jena Lee
Caroline Legrand
Grégory Lemarchal
Gérard Lenorman
Nolwenn Leroy
Leslie
Héloïse Letissier
Daniel Lévi (born in Algeria, with singing career in France)
Pierrick Lilliu
Caroline Loeb
Emily Loizeau
Yoann Lemoine
Claudine Longet
Lorie
Lova Moor
Luce
Renan Luce
Sheryfa Luna

M

Maurane
Mort Shuman
-M-
Mad in Paris
Melissa M
MC Solar
Mellowman
Enrico Macias (born in Algeria, with a singing career in France)
Jean-Pierre Mader
Christophe Maé
Mano Solo
Léo Marjane
Mireille Mathieu
Margaux Avril
Sara Mandiano
Gérard Manset
Jeane Manson (born in the United States, with a singing career in France) 
Guy Marchand
Luis Mariano (born in Spain, with a singing career in France)
Marie France
Jeanne Mas
Syd Matters
Elli Medeiros
Ménélik (born in Cameroon, with a singing career in France)
Art Mengo
Anne Meson
Miossec
Mirwais
Mistinguett
Eddy Mitchell
Ilona Mitrecey (for children)
Stéphanie of Monaco (born in Monaco, with a singing career in France)
Marie Möör
Gilbert Montagné
Yves Montand
Moos
Jeanne Moreau
Éric Morena
Darío Moreno
Marcel Mouloudji
Nana Mouskouri (born in Greece, with a singing career in France and worldwide)
Georges Moustaki
Jean-Louis Murat
Thierry Mutin
Marie Myriam (born Myriam Lopes in Braga, Portugal, French and Portuguese singer)
Maître Gims

N

Nâdiya
Aya Nakamura (born in Mali, with a singing career in France)
Nicoletta
Yannick Noah
Magali Noël
Claude Nougaro
Juliette Noureddine

O

Pascal Obispo
Michel Orso

P

Florent Pagny
Vanessa Paradis
Partenaire Particulier
Jean-Claude Pascal
Passi
Thierry Pastor (born in North Africa, with a singing career in France)
Patachou
Sabine Paturel
Pauline
Guesch Patti
Pierre Perret
Paul Personne
Peter & Sloane
Nicolas Peyrac
Édith Piaf
Anne Pigalle
Jacques Pills
Pol Plançon
Benoît Poher (band: Kyo)
M. Pokora
Michel Polnareff
Princess Erika
PNL
Barbara Pravi

Q

Jakie Quartz

R

Raphaël
Serge Reggiani (May 2, 1922 - July 23, 2004), born in Italy, with a singing career in France) 
Régine (December 26, 1929 - May 1, 2022, born in Belgium, with a singing career in France)
Renaud
Line Renaud
Axelle Renoir
Catherine Ringer
Dick Rivers
Robert
Mado Robin
Sébastien Roch
Hélène Rollès
Christine Roque
Tino Rossi
Rosy Armen
Olivia Ruiz
Philippe Russo

S

Jean Sablon
Damien Saez
Cindy Sander
Bernard Sauvat
Henri Salvador
Véronique Sanson
Sapho
Michel Sardou
Vivien Savage
Patrick Sebastien
Hélène Ségara
Séverine
Shake
Sheila
William Sheller
Kool Shen (band: NTM)
Shona
Shurik'n (band: IAM)
Shy'm
Emilie Simon
Yves Simon
Nicola Sirkis (band: Indochine)
Slimane Nebchi (better known as Slimane)
MC Solaar (born in Senegal, with a singing career in France)
Mano Solo
Soprano
Alain Souchon
Gérard Souzay
Natasha St-Pier (born in Canada, with a singing career in France)
Stromae Belgian singer-songwriter
Stanislas
Martin Solveig

T

Jacqueline Taïeb
Tancrède
Sébastien Tellier
Allan Théo
Hubert-Félix Thiéfaine
Yann Tiersen
Michèle Torr
Charles Trénet

V

Jacques Vaillant
François Valéry
Sylvie Vartan
Emma Vecla (1877–1972), operatic soprano
Vegastar
Boris Vian
Hervé Vilard
Vitaa
Laurent Voulzy

W

Wallen
Noé Willer
Christophe Willem (born Christophe Durier)

Y

Jean Yanne
Michael Youn (comic performer and singer; band: Fatal Bazooka)
Yelle

Z

Zaho (born in Algeria)
Zaz
Zazie
Julie Zenatti
Zouzou (born in Algeria, with a singing career in France)

See also

 List of French people
 List of singer-songwriters
 Lists of musicians

 
Singers
French